It's So Good is the tenth studio album by Freestyle musician Stevie B, released on April 29, 2000, by Bolari Records. Two singles, "It's So Good" and "You Are the One" (a cover of the song originally released by Count to Twenty), were released, but neither made the charts.

Even without the success of the singles, and with little exposure for the album, It's So Good did manage to enter the album chart in Germany, where it reached No. 99 in a one-week stay on the chart.

Track listing

Charts

References

Stevie B albums
2000 albums